Wiang Yong is a village and tambon (sub-district) of Mueang Lamphun District, in Lamphun Province, Thailand. In 2005 it had a population of  6,096 people. The tambon contains eight villages.

References

Tambon of Lamphun province
Populated places in Lamphun province